Nagaravaridhi Naduvail Njan ( The Great Town and Me in the Middle)  is a 2014 Malayalam film directed by Shibu Balan and written by Sreenivasan. It stars Sreenivasan, Sangita, Bheeman Raghu and Innocent in major roles. It marked Sangita’s return to films after a 14-year sabbatical from acting.

Plot
The film tells the story of Venu, whose dream is to get an MBBS admission for his daughter. For his dream to fulfil, he decides to sell his property. But, the colony members try to disrupt his plans.

Cast
Sreenivasan as Venu
Sangita
Bheeman Raghu
Innocent as Davis
Manoj K Jayan as Suresh
Sethu Lakshmi
Vijayaraghavan
Lal
Prem Kumar
Joy Mathew
Meghna Vincent

Reception
Asha Prakash for The Times of India rated the film two and a half stars out of five and commented: "... the climax is interesting and the film does have several messages ... Innocent, Vijayaraghavan and Bheeman Raghu play their parts convincingly and provide comic relief and the residential colony scenes remind you of the evergreen comedies of Malayalam. However, the subtlety of satire and the sharp wit in a Sreenivasan script is missing and the attempts at sarcasm are naive."

Paresh C. Palicha for Rediff gave a rating of two stars out of five and considered: ... "When the film suggests that a common man can be coerced into becoming a contract killer to fulfill the dreams of his children, our credibility is stretched too far. ... "Innocent and Vijayaragavan are used as staple comedians. This deepens our disappointment with the overall proceedings."

Sify.com film rated the film two stars from five and commented: " ... Nagaravaridhi Naduvil Njan has its heart at the right place, but the way it has been presented lets you down. The issues being narrated here are relevant but you will need solid patience to sit through this one and to appreciate it."

References

2010s Malayalam-language films
Films scored by Govind Vasantha